Franklin K. Lane High School (FKLHS) was a public high school in New York City, New York, United States. It began as a combined junior-senior high school in 1923 and moved into its current building in 1937. In 2012, it was shut down by the City of New York "for poor performance".

New schools opened on the campus and they are administered by the New York City Department of Education as H.S. 420.  Today the school is the campus site for six different high schools: The Academy of Innovative Technology, The Brooklyn Lab School, Cypress Hill Prep Academy, The Urban Assembly School for Collaborative Healthcare, Multicultural High School and Uncommon Leadership Charter High School.

Location
The campus is located on the Brooklyn/Queens border at the bottom of a steep hill at the corner of Dexter Court and Jamaica Avenue. The line separating the boroughs of Brooklyn and Queens, which runs along Eldert Lane from Atlantic Avenue, passes through the school and the cemetery adjacent to it.

History

The school is named for Franklin Knight Lane, United States Secretary of the Interior during the administration of President Woodrow Wilson. One of the accomplishments of his tenure was the formation of the National Park Service.

At the time Franklin K. Lane High School was built, it was one of the largest high school buildings in the world. The perimeter of the building measures approximately one-quarter mile; walking four times around it equals one mile.

The school building was a project of the WPA during the Franklin D. Roosevelt Administration.

The boys' large gymnasium is named for 1938 alumnus William "Red" Holzman. The library is named for Sam Levenson, another alumnus, Class of 1930. The Guidance Suite of offices is named for Franklin A. Thomas, a 1952 alumnus; former President of the Ford Foundation.

During the 1960s/1970s, Franklin K. Lane High School fell on hard times. A large part of this period was documented in "RACE WAR IN HIGH SCHOOL: The Ten Year Destruction of Franklin K. Lane High School in Brooklyn," a book By Harold Saltzman, a social studies teacher and union leader at the school during that period. Parents and teachers brought a legal action in regard to the racial imbalance and poor performance at Lane. In 1974 Judge John Dooling of the Federal Court's Southern District of New York ruled that education at the school was inferior and ruled that the school racial imbalance was to be addressed by redistricting and redesigning the school program. The "new" Franklin K. Lane opened in September 1976 with a 40% white, 30% Hispanic, and 30% African-American student body. The school thrived for a period and became known in some circles as "the miracle on Jamaica Avenue".

In 1978, Franklin K. Lane High School was one of ten schools across the nation cited by the United States Congress in the Safe School Study. The school was included in many case studies produced by the United States Government as well as private foundations, for its turnaround and for its safety in the midst of urban decline and deterioration.

In the 1970s and 1980s, numerous programs were available to assist and enhance students' academic performance:  College Bound Program, Career Development Program (CDP), Co-Op Program, Study to Employment Program, (STEP), and Toward Upward Mobility Program (TUM). To address the problems of students with difficulty attending school, the SOAR program was initiated and recognized by the Federal Government for excellence. The school's General Equivalency Diploma (GED) program was one of the most successful in the city with a code of 421.  Later, a parent suit brought into question the school's methods of counseling students who were not attending classes regularly. Eventually, these disruptive students were allowed to attend the school again, causing security problems. During the 1980s and 1990s, the school's magnet Law Studies Program attracted students from various parts of New York City, many of whom went on to attend prestigious universities, such as Columbia, Cornell, NYU, and Syracuse. A majority of Lane's Honors Program alumni also fared well.

On March 8, 2004, the New York Daily News' front page headline "City's Worst School" led to a story in the newspaper regarding the poor academic performance, low graduation rates, violence, and students transferring out in large numbers due to those problems. In December 2007, the Department of Education announced that Franklin K. Lane would be phased out due to consistently poor performance. The school stopped accepting 9th graders in 2007 and graduated its last seniors in 2012. Not all of the replacement schools have received acceptable ratings.

In September 2016, exterior shots of the school were filmed for the 2017 Marvel Studios film Spider-Man: Homecoming, while In April 2019, interior shots of the school lobby were filmed for the 2019 film Avengers: Endgame, both set in the Marvel Cinematic Universe (MCU). The edifice doubles as the Midtown School of Science and Technology, the school which Peter Parker attended.

Demographics

Notable alumni
Notable alumni of the school include:

Ted Ashley (1922–2002), chairman of the Warner Bros. film studio and founder of the Ashley-Famous talent agency
Tony Consiglio (born 1970), cartoonist.
Randolph Evans (1961-1976), murder victim of New York City Police Department officer Robert H. Torsney.
John Gotti (1940-2002), Mafia boss who headed the Gambino crime family, after dropping out at age 16.
José Greco (1918-2000), dancer / choreographer.
Bob Grim (1930-1996), major league baseball player
Richie Havens (1941-2013), singer-songwriter and guitarist (dropped out)
William "Red" Holzman (1920-1998), NBA 2-time All-Star Basketball Player, Coach, and Hall of Famer.
Shelley Hirsch (born 1952), avant-garde singer / performer.
Earle Hyman (1926-2017), actor
Anne Jackson (1925-2016, class of 1943), actress.
Alfred Kazin (1915-1998), writer
Sam Levenson (1911-1980), writer / television host/ journalist.
Peter Senerchia (born 1967), professional wrestler known as Tazz.
DJ Spinderella (born 1971), member of the hip-hop group Salt-n-Pepa.
Franklin A. Thomas (born 1934), former President and CEO of the Ford Foundation.
Sam Worthen (born 1958) NBA Basketball player.
Jeru The Damaja (born 1972), rapper & member of the Gang Starr Foundation.

References

Sources
www.insideschools.org

New York City Department of Education
Defunct high schools in Brooklyn
Public high schools in Brooklyn